Mimocagosima is a genus of longhorn beetles of the subfamily Lamiinae, containing the following species:

 Mimocagosima humeralis (Gressitt, 1951)
 Mimocagosima ochreipennis Breuning, 1968

References

Saperdini